The Skin We're In is a Canadian documentary film, directed by Charles Officer and released in 2017. Based in part on Desmond Cole's award-winning 2015 essay, "The Skin I'm In", for Toronto Life, the film documents the history and reality of racism against Black Canadians.

The film premiered as an episode of CBC Television's documentary series Firsthand on March 9, 2017. It was subsequently given a special free theatrical screening in April 2017 as part of the Regent Park Film Festival.

The film was a nominee for the Donald Brittain Award at the 6th Canadian Screen Awards in 2018.

References

External links
 

2017 television films
2017 films
2017 documentary films
Canadian documentary television films
Films directed by Charles Officer
CBC Television original films
Documentary films about Black Canadians
2010s Canadian films